Glory Road is the ninth studio album by Australian rock music singer-songwriter, Richard Clapton released in October 1987. 
The album reached No. 28 on the Kent Music Report Albums Chart.

Track listing

Charts

Release history

References 

1987 albums
Richard Clapton albums
Warner Records albums